Al-H̨arīq or Al Hareeq is a small town in Riyadh Province, Saudi Arabia. As of the 2004 census it had a population of 7304 people.

Description
Al-H̨arīq is a small village located in the south of Riyadh. It is considered one of the subordinate villages of Banu Tamim, which is famous for palm cultivation.

See also 

 List of cities and towns in Saudi Arabia
 Regions of Saudi Arabia

References

Populated places in Riyadh Province